The 2006–2007 season was Milton Keynes Dons' third season in their existence as a professional association football club. This season was their first season competing in League Two, the fourth tier of English football, following their relegation from League One at the conclusion of the 2005–06 season.

As well as competing in League Two, the club also participated in the FA Cup, League Cup and League Trophy.

The season covers the period from 1 July 2006 to 30 June 2007.

Competitions

League Two

Final table

Source: Sky Sports

Matches

Play-offs

FA Cup

Matches

League Cup

Matches

League Trophy

Matches

Player details
List of squad players, including number of appearances by competition.
Players with squad numbers struck through and marked  left the club during the playing season.

|}

Transfers

Transfers in

Transfers out

Loans in

Loans out

References

External links

Official Supporters Association website
MK Dons news on MKWeb

Milton Keynes Dons
Milton Keynes Dons F.C. seasons